SE Trains Limited, trading as Southeastern, is a train operator, owned by DfT OLR Holdings for the Department for Transport, that took over operating the South Eastern franchise in South East England from privately owned London & South Eastern Railway (which also traded as Southeastern) on 17 October 2021.

History
In September 2021, the Department for Transport announced it would be terminating the South Eastern franchise operated by Govia-owned Southeastern after revenue declaration discrepancies involving £25million of public money were discovered. SE Trains, as an operator of last resort, took over the franchise on 17 October 2021,
for a six-year period until 17 October 2027.

Southeastern is one of several train operators impacted by the 2022–2023 United Kingdom railway strikes, which are the first national rail strikes in the UK for three decades. Its workers are amongst those who are participating in industrial action due to a dispute over pay and working conditions.

In November 2022, Southeastern began the process of procuring new trains, to be made up of between 350 and 640 new carriages. These would enter service in the mid-2020s.

Overview
SE Trains serves the main London stations of Charing Cross, Waterloo East, Cannon Street, London Bridge, St Pancras, Victoria and Blackfriars.
with 180 stations, 164 of which it manages.

Routes
Southeastern initially began trading operating the same routes and services as its predecessor. However, in December 2022, a new timetable was introduced aiming to reduce congestion, improve reliability and better match demand following the COVID-19 pandemic.

As of December 2022, the weekday off-peak service pattern, with frequencies in trains per hour (tph), is:

Rolling stock
SE Trains is operating the same electric multiple units as its predecessor. The remainder of the 30 Class 707s will enter service as they are released by South Western Railway.

Current fleet

References

External links

 

Department for Transport
Government-owned companies of England
Operators of last resort
Railway companies established in 2021
Railway operators in London
Train operating companies in the United Kingdom
2021 establishments in England